The Isle of Pines (name in Kanak language Kwênyii) is an island in the Pacific Ocean, in the archipelago of New Caledonia, an overseas collectivity of France. The island is part of the commune (municipality) of L'Île-des-Pins, in the South Province of New Caledonia.  The Isle of Pines is nicknamed  ("the closest island to Paradise").

There is one airport (code ILP) with a  runway. The Isle of Pines is surrounded by the New Caledonia Barrier Reef.

The inhabitants of the island are mainly native Melanesian Kanaks, and the population is 2,000 (estimated 2006) (1989 population 1,465).

The island is rich with animal life and is home to unusual creatures such as the crested gecko Correlophus ciliatus and the world's largest gecko Rhacodactylus leachianus.

The  is the island's highest point, at  elevation. River Ouro is the longest river.

History

Melanesian people lived on the island for over 2000 years before the island was first visited by Europeans. Captain James Cook in 1774 saw the island and renamed it on his second voyage to New Zealand. Cook gave the island its name after seeing the tall native pines (Araucaria columnaris).  He never disembarked onto the island, but as he saw signs of inhabitance (smoke) assumed it was inhabited. In the 1840s Protestant and Catholic missionaries arrived, along with merchants seeking sandalwood.

The French took possession of the island in 1853 at which time the native Kunies opted for the Catholic religion. In 1872 the island became a French penal colony, home to 3,000 political deportees from the Paris Commune.

Sights 
The ruins of a penal colony can be seen in the village of Ouro in the west of the island. The water tower of Ouro which was built by prisoners in 1874/75 and renovated in 2005 is still used.

At the cemetery Cimetière des Déportés near Ouro is a pyramid-shaped memorial and the graves of 300 deportees who died between 1872 and 1880.

References

External links

  www.isle-of-pines.com General and tourist information about the Isle of Pines
Audio interview with Isle of Pines resident about life on the Isle of Pines
Jane's Isle of Pines Page 
Isle of Pines photos

Islands of New Caledonia